Flagstones is a late Neolithic interrupted ditch enclosure (similar to a causewayed enclosure) on the outskirts of Dorchester, Dorset, England. It derives its name from having been discovered beneath the site of the demolished Flagstones House. Half of it was excavated in the 1980s when the Dorchester by-pass was built; the rest of it still exists under the grounds of Max Gate, Thomas Hardy's house.

The Druid Stone
In March 1891 workmen were digging under the lawn at Thomas Hardy's house at Max Gate when they discovered a large sarsen stone  underground. It took seven men with levers to raise the stone which had been lying flat. Around the stone was a quantity of ashes and half-charred bones. Hardy called it "The Druid Stone" and had it erected at the edge of the lawn where it still stands. Hardy would write about the stone in his poem "The Shadow on the Stone". It was only when the enclosure was discovered in the 1980s that it was realised that the sarsen stone came from a larger monument.

Excavations
Around half of the enclosure was excavated in 1987–8. The part of the enclosure in the grounds of Flagstones House was excavated by Wessex Archaeology, and then the grounds were totally removed to make a deep cutting for the Dorchester by-pass road. The other half still exists under the grounds of Max Gate.

The enclosure comprised a circular ring of unevenly spaced pits constructed in the late 4th millennium BC. The chalk walls of some of the pit/ditch segments featured engraved designs, probably cut with flint. An adult cremation and two child inhumations were found at the bottom of ditch sections, each beneath a slab of sandstone or sarsen. A young man had been buried in a later Early Bronze Age tumulus in the centre of the enclosure. Carbon dating of the remains put the building of the enclosure at around 3486–2886 BC with the central burial dating to around a thousand years later. The central mound seems to have subsequently acted as a focus for much flint-knapping.

A large henge enclosure known as Mount Pleasant henge lies around 500 metres to the east, whereas Maumbury Rings lie about 1500 metres to the west.

References

Further reading
Roland J. C. Smith, 1997, Excavations along the Route of the Dorchester Bypass, Dorset  Wessex Archaeology Report

History of Dorchester, Dorset
Stone Age sites in England
Archaeological sites in Dorset